Champions III is a 1984 role-playing game supplement for Champions published by Hero Games.

Contents
Champions III includes a wide selection of revisions and editions to the existing rules, plus several new modules.

Reception
Allen Varney reviewed Champions III in Space Gamer No. 70. Sheeley commented that "I recommend Champions III unreservedly to all Champions buffs who haven't been sated by I and II. It's an excellent supplement, well worth the price to players and GMs eager to expand their superheroic horizons."

Pete Tamlyn reviewed Champions III for Imagine magazine, and stated that " Champions players [...] will probably be interested in useful new rule systems [...] Champions III is not so good in this respect. With the notable exception of the random character generator mentioned above, most of the hardware concerns new powers or modifications to old ones. h is more of a set of upgrade notes than a supplement."

Reviews
Different Worlds #39 (May/June, 1985)

References

Champions (role-playing game) supplements
Role-playing game supplements introduced in 1984